WAIC (91.9 FM) is the college radio station of American International College in Springfield, Massachusetts.  It is operated by the Five College Consortium's National Public Radio member station, WFCR, and serves as a relay of the all-news format airing on WFCR's sister station, WNNZ.

History
WAIC first went on air in February 1967, going stereo in 1985.  Initially programmed from American International College. In the 1970s WAIC was a local favorite alternative to Top 40 programming, well known for disco, funk, and progressive rock. With AIC changing its focus to being a commuter college, it decided to stop programming the station directly and contracted with Connecticut Public Radio to carry their programming as of November 1, 2011. On July 1, 2016, it began relaying WNNZ.

See also
 WFCR

References

External links

NPR member stations
AIC
Radio stations established in 1967
American International College
Mass media in Springfield, Massachusetts
1967 establishments in Massachusetts